Roberto 'Bobby' Jesse Gonzales (born 1951 in Taos, New Mexico) is an American politician and a Democratic member of the New Mexico House of Representatives representing District 42 since January 1995.

Education
Gonzales earned his BS from the University of New Mexico and his MA from New Mexico Highlands University.

Career
Prior to serving in the New Mexico House of Representatives, Gonzales was an educator.

When District 42 Democratic Representative Frederick Peralta left the Legislature and left the seat open, Gonzales ran in the five-way June 7, 1994 Democratic Primary, winning with 1,540 votes (36.5%) and won the November 8, 1994 General election with 4,205 votes (60.3%) against Republican nominee Telesfor Gonzales.

Gonzales was challenged in the June 4, 1996 Democratic Primary, winning with 2,969 votes (69.6%) and was unopposed for the November 5, 1996 General election.

Gonzales was unopposed for in his 1998, 2000, 2002, 2004, 2008, 2010, and 2012 Democratic primary campaigns.

After the death of Carlos Cisneros, Gonzales was appointed fill his vacant seat in the New Mexico Senate by Governor Michelle Lujan Grisham.

References

External links
Official page at the New Mexico Legislature

Roberto Gonzales at Ballotpedia
Roberto J. Bobby Gonzales at the National Institute on Money in State Politics

1951 births
Living people
21st-century American politicians
Hispanic and Latino American state legislators in New Mexico
Democratic Party members of the New Mexico House of Representatives
New Mexico Highlands University alumni
People from Taos, New Mexico
University of New Mexico alumni
Date of birth missing (living people)